Bill Hosking (born 19 July 1940) is a former  Australian rules footballer who played with Geelong in the Victorian Football League (VFL). He is the brother of Ron Hosking and the uncle of Scott Hosking, both of whom played for Geelong. Bill was the Lismore Football Club's Best and Fairest winner of 1958 and also played in the Geelong reserves Premiership team of 1963 alongside his brother Ron and fellow former Lismore Football Club teammate, John Fox.

Notes

External links 

Living people
1940 births
Australian rules footballers from Victoria (Australia)
Geelong Football Club players
Ballarat Football Club players